Matanchén is the name of both the bay and one of the small towns located just south of San Blas, Nayarit, on the Pacific coast of Mexico. It is known for its exceptionally long surf break. A local surfer familiar with the conditions was quoted as saying "one quarter to half mile waves are not uncommon."

Matanchén is also the site of one of the earliest settlements in Western Mexico.  The site dates to approximately 2000-2100 BCE.

Further reading

Populated places in Nayarit
Beaches of Nayarit
Port cities and towns on the Mexican Pacific coast